Norma Icardi (born 16 August 1930) is an Italian gymnast. She competed in the women's artistic team all-around at the 1948 Summer Olympics.

References

External links
 

1930 births
Possibly living people
Italian female artistic gymnasts
Olympic gymnasts of Italy
Gymnasts at the 1948 Summer Olympics
Sportspeople from Trieste